Chalian may refer to:

Chalgan (Chālīān), a village in Iran
 (born 1966), Republic of Armenia Military Commissar (2009-2012), major-general
Yuri Chalyan (born 1933), colonel of the Armed Forces and Police of the Republic of Armenia
David Chalian (born 1973), American political journalist